Colin Egan (born 1989 in Belmont, County Offaly, Ireland) is an Irish sportsperson.  He plays hurling with his local club Belmont and has been a member of the Offaly senior inter-county team since 2011.

Playing career

Club

Egan plays his club hurling with Belmont.

Inter-county

Egan has lined out in all grades for Offaly.  He started in 2007 as a member of the county's minor hurling team before subsequently joining the Offaly under-21 team.  In 2008 he lined out in the Leinster under-21 decider, however, Kilkenny won that game easily.

Egan was just out of the under-21 grade when he joined the Offaly senior hurling team in 2011.  He made his debut as a substitute in a National Hurling League game against Kilkenny, however, he failed to secure a place on the starting fifteen.  Egan made his championship debut  at wing-forward against Dublin in 2011.

Media career 
In 2016, Egan and his family competed in the fourth series of the popular RTÉ reality competition, Ireland's Fittest Family. They were eliminated in the first round of the competition.

References

 

1989 births
Living people
Belmont hurlers
Offaly inter-county hurlers